The England cricket team toured Pakistan from 20 October to 11 December 2000 for a three-match One Day International series and a three-match Test series. England toured Pakistan after a gap of 13 years.

Pakistan won the ODI series 2–1 after losing the first ODI, while England won the Test series 1–0 after the first two Tests finished in draws. It was England's first Test victory against Pakistan in Pakistan since they toured in 1961–62.

It was England's first series victory in Pakistan for 39 years, and the first defeat in 35 Tests in Karachi for Pakistan.

Squads

Tour matches

50-over: Sind Governor's XI vs England XI

50-over: Pakistan A vs England XI

First-class: Pakistan Cricket Board Patron's XI vs England XI

First-class: North West Frontier Province Governor's XI vs England XI

First-class: Pakistan Cricket Board XI vs England XI

ODI series

1st ODI

2nd ODI

3rd ODI

Test series

1st Test

2nd Test

3rd Test

References

External links
England in Pakistan 2000-01 at Cricinfo

2000 in English cricket
2000 in Pakistani cricket
2000-01
International cricket competitions in 2000–01
Pakistani cricket seasons from 2000–01